Johannes Eder (born 19 October 1979) is an Austrian cross-country skier who competed between 1998 and 2007. 

Eder has five individual career victories up to 30 km (four in Continental Cup, one in an FIS race) from 2001 to 2004. In 2006, he was disqualified for doping violations in the last two races he entered for the 2005-06 racing season, but was reinstated in time to compete in the 2007 FIS Nordic World Ski Championships in Sapporo.

On 22 November 2007, the FIS announced that Eder along with two other cross country skiers from Austria (Roland Diethard and Martin Tauber), received two-year bans for doping incurred. All results from the incursion that was caught on 18 February 2006 during the 2006 Winter Olympics in Turin for Eder and the two other skiers to the date of the suspension issued were disqualified and any awards earned were forfeited. Seven months earlier, Eder received a lifetime ban from the IOC for his doping actions in Turin.

Cross-country skiing results

Olympic Games

World Championships

World Cup

References

FIS announcement on 22 November 2007 about doping violations during the 2006 Winter Olympics - accessed 29 November 2007.
TSN.ca announcement of Eder's ban.

External links

1979 births
Austrian male cross-country skiers
Austrian sportspeople in doping cases
Cross-country skiers at the 2006 Winter Olympics
Doping cases in cross-country skiing
Living people
Olympic cross-country skiers of Austria
Universiade medalists in cross-country skiing
Universiade bronze medalists for Austria
Competitors at the 2001 Winter Universiade
20th-century Austrian people